The 2nd National Television Awards ceremony was held at the Royal Albert Hall on 9 October 1996 and was hosted by Trevor McDonald.

Awards

References

National Television Awards
National Television Awards
National Television Awards
1996 in London
National Television Awards
National Television Awards